USS Moccasin (SS-5) (later renamed A-4) was one of seven s built for the United States Navy (USN) in the first decade of the 20th century.

Description
The Plunger-class submarines were enlarged and improved versions of the preceding , the first submarine in the USN. They displaced  on the surface and  submerged. The Plunger-class boats had a crew of one officer and six enlisted men.

For surface running, they were powered by one  gasoline engine that drove the single propeller shaft. When submerged the propeller was driven by a  electric motor. The boats could reach  on the surface and  underwater.

The Plunger-class boats were armed with one 18-inch (450 mm)  torpedo tube in the bow. They carried two reloads, for a total of three torpedoes.

Construction and career
Moccasin was laid down under the direction of Arthur Leopold Busch on 8 November 1900 in Elizabeth, New Jersey at the Crescent Shipyard, launched on 20 August 1901, and commissioned on 17 January 1903 at the Holland Torpedo Boat Station at New Suffolk, N.Y. Assigned to duty at the Naval Torpedo Station at Newport, Moccasin operated locally on principally training and experimental activities until assigned to the Reserve Torpedo Flotilla at Norfolk on 15 June 1904, in which unit she remained inactive for the next half decade. The submarine ran aground in North Carolina's outer banks in late 1903, and was several miles away from the Wright Brothers' inaugural flight on 17 December 1903.  1904 On 20 July 1909, the submarine torpedo boat was loaded onto the collier , which sailed soon thereafter for the Philippines. Moccasins sister-ship, was on board as deck cargo as well, lashed to the auxiliary's forward well deck. Arriving at Olongapo on 1 October, Moccasin was launched on 7 October. Recommissioned on 10 February 1910, she was assigned to the First Submarine Division, Asiatic Torpedo Fleet, based in the Manila area.

A new name
Moccasin was renamed A-4 on 17 November 1911. During World War I, like her sister-ships, she patrolled the entrance to Manila Bay and convoyed ships moving out of local waters. Later placed in reserve, A-4 was decommissioned at Cavite on 12 December 1919.

Notes

References

External links
Photo gallery at Naval Historical Center
Photo gallery at Navsource.org

 

Ships built in Elizabeth, New Jersey
Moccasin 005
World War I submarines of the United States
1901 ships
Ships sunk as targets